Cypricardinia is an extinct genus of bivalves. Species are found worldwide.

References

External links
 

Carditida
Prehistoric bivalve genera
Paleozoic animals of North America
Carboniferous animals of South America
Carboniferous Argentina
Fossils of Argentina
Devonian animals of South America
Devonian Colombia
Fossils of Colombia
Floresta Formation
Paleozoic life of Alberta
Paleozoic life of Manitoba
Fossil taxa described in 1830